Mölgg (sometimes spelled as Moelgg) is a surname. Notable people with the surname include:

 Manfred Mölgg (born 1982), Italian skier
 Manuela Mölgg (born 1983), Italian skier, sister of Manfred

Surnames of South Tyrolean origin